Tonchev is a Bulgarian surname. Notable people with this name include:

Dimo Angelov Tonchev (born 1952), Bulgarian cyclist
Gergina Toncheva (1932–2020), Bulgarian teacher
Petar Tonchev (born 1989), Bulgarian footballer
Stefan Tonchev (1896–1916), Bulgarian footballer

Bulgarian-language surnames